Sheridan Mortlock (born 19 May 2000) is an Australian model, international relations student, and beauty pageant titleholder who was crowned Miss Earth Air 2022. By winning Miss Earth – Air 2022, she becomes the third Australian beauty queen to get the Miss Earth – Air title after 2017 and 2015.

Early life and education
Sheridan and her family traveled around Australia via camper trailer when she was 9 years old. She was homeschooled together with her two younger brothers as they explored the diversity and beauty of Australia. They settled in Jerilderie soon after.

In September 2018, she graduated from Finley High School in Finley, New South Wales. She eventually entered the University of Wollongong in Wollongong, New South Wales to obtain double bachelor's degrees in global sustainability and politics.

During one of her interviews after her Miss Earth-Air 2022 win, Sheridan shared that she plans to do her responsibilities as Miss Earth-Air together with her academic obligations.

Pageantry

Miss Earth Australia
Sheridan is also known for joining Miss Earth Australia three times.

Sheridan started her pageantry journey in 2019 when she joined Miss Earth Australia 2019. She was crowned Miss Earth – Australia Air 2019. She also won various special awards such as "Miss Photogenic" and "Darling of the Press."

The following year, in response to the effects of Covid-19 pandemic, Miss Earth Australia Organization decided to choose a delegate for Miss Earth 2020 from the roster of the elemental queens from the previous year. Sheridan, being the Miss Earth Australia Air 2019, was one of the three titleholders who got called back in having a chance to be Miss Earth Australia 2020. At the end of the evaluation, the title of Miss Earth Australia 2020 was awarded to Brittany Dickson.

On 4 September 2022, Sheridan was crowned as Miss Earth Australia 2022 at Hyatt Regency in Sydney, Australia. She was also given special awards such as "Darling of the Press", "Best in Swimwear" and "Best in Evening Gown". She was crowned by Miss Earth Australia 2021, Phoebe Soegiono.

Miss Earth 2022
By winning Miss Earth Australia 2022, Sheridan was tasked to have advocacy as one of the core requirements for joining Miss Earth. Her advocacy is entitled ACE which is an acronym for Action, Care, and Education. Mortlock added, "Climate change and environmental protection are all linked through webs of connection. If we change one element of the ecosystem, then it will ripple out to others. This is why we must use the pillars of ACE to make the most effective changes. Only through Caring about our environment, Educating ourselves on current environmental changes, and then taking direct Action will we be able to protect Mother Earth."

Since the main theme of Miss Earth 2022 was ME Loves Fauna, the candidates were also required to promote a creature from their country; Sheridan chose the Swift parrot . She said that according to reports, there are only 750 left which makes it a critically endangered species. She cited the habitat loss in Tasmania, which is the Swift parrots' breeding grounds, as the main reason this.

Mortlock competed with 85 other delegates from various in the hopes of becoming Miss Earth 2022.

During the course of the preliminary events, she won the following awards:
 Darling of the Press (Asia & Oceania)
 Swimsuit Competition (Asia & Oceania)
 Beach Wear Competition (Fire Group)
 Miss Congeniality

At the end of the coronation night of Miss Earth 2022, Sheridan was declared as Miss Earth – Air 2022; while South Korea's Mina Sue Choi was called the winner of Miss Earth 2022.

References

External links

2000 births
Living people
Australian beauty pageant winners
Australian female models
People from New South Wales
Miss Earth 2022 contestants